Odostomia is the most speciose genus of minute sea snails, pyramidellid gastropod mollusks. This genus is placed in the family Pyramidellidae in the subfamily Odostomiinae. There are several hundred species in this diverse genus (Schander et al. 1999) 

Most of the description of species in the genus Odostomia was carried out by Dall & Bartsch in 1909.  Many of the described species are however suspected of being synonyms, or are proven synonyms.

The genus Odostomia Fleming, 1813 was used by 19th century authors, particularly in the European literature, for most of the smaller Pyramidellidae. It is still a catchall for most small pyramidellids lacking both axial and spiral sculpture. Some authors, e.g. Høisæter (2014), Peñas, Rolán & Swinnen (2014) and Giannuzzi-Savelli et al. (2014) who are here followed have attempted to redistribute some of the species, but there are still many species remaining unduly under Odostomia. For these, the database WoRMS has refrained from making new combinations not backed by (or implicit from) a published source but, unless otherwise noted, the species that were already "accepted" under a subgenus now raised to full genus have been marked as "accepted" under that full genus.

The European and American species of Odostomia differ in several anatomical and shell characteristics. They are therefore likely to be assigned to different genera.

Species 
Species within the genus Odostomia include:

A 

 Odostomia aartseni Nofroni, 1988
 Odostomia achatinella A. Adams, 1860
 Odostomia acrybia Dall & Bartsch, 1909
 Odostomia acuta Jeffreys, 1848
 Odostomia acutangula Suter, 1908
 Odostomia acutidens Dall, 1884
 Odostomia aepynota Dall & Bartsch, 1909
 Odostomia aequisculpta Carpenter, 1864
 Odostomia aethra Bartsch, 1915
 Odostomia albuquerqueae Peñas, Rolán & Swinnen, 2014
 Odostomia aleutica Dall & Bartsch, 1909
 Odostomia alia Peñas & Rolán, 1999
 Odostomia aliquanta Penas & Rolan, 1999
 Odostomia altina Dall & Bartsch, 1909
 Odostomia amanda Garrett, 1863
 † Odostomia amava T. Oldroyd, 1925
 Odostomia americana Dall & Bartsch, 1904
 Odostomia amianta Dall & Bartsch, 1907
 Odostomia amilda Dall & Bartsch, 1909
 Odostomia anabathmis Melvill, 1910
 † Odostomia ancisa (Marwick, 1931)
 Odostomia andamanensis (Preston, 1908)
 Odostomia angularis Dall & Bartsch, 1907
 Odostomia antelia Melvill, 1896
 Odostomia anxia Hedley, 1909
 Odostomia aomori Nomura, 1938
 Odostomia apexdemissus Peñas, Rolán & Swinnen, 2014
 Odostomia armata Carpenter, 1857
  † Odostomia arowhana (Marwick, 1931)
 Odostomia aspera Nomura, 1938
 Odostomia astricta Dall & Bartsch, 1907
 Odostomia ata Bartsch, 1926
 Odostomia atossa Dall, 1908
 Odostomia aucklandica Laws, 1939
 Odostomia audax Baker, Hanna & Strong, 1928
 Odostomia avellana Carpenter, 1864
 † Odostomia awatumida Laws, 1939
 Odostomia ayukawaensis Nomura, 1938
 Odostomia azteca Strong & Hertlein, 1939

B 

 Odostomia babylonica Winckworth, 1940
 Odostomia bachia Bartsch, 1927
 Odostomia baldridgeae Bartsch, 1912
 Odostomia bapaulinoae Peñas, Rolán & Swinnen, 2019
 Odostomia baranoffensis Dall & Bartsch, 1909
 Odostomia barkleyensis Dall & Bartsch, 191
 Odostomia barnardi van Aartsen & Corgan, 1996
  † Odostomia bartrumi Laws, 1940
 Odostomia becki W.H. Turton, 1933
 Odostomia bentenzimana Nomura, 1937
 Odostomia benthina Dall & Bartsch, 1909
 Odostomia beringi Dall, 1871
 Odostomia bernardi (van Aartsen, Gittenberger & Goud, 1998)
  † Odostomia biangulata Laws, 1939
 Odostomia biformis Saurin, 1962
 Odostomia bismichaelis Sacco, 1892
 Odostomia bissagosensis Peñas, Rolán & Swinnen, 2014
 Odostomia boermani van Aartsen, Gittenberger E. & Goud, 1998
 Odostomia brandhorsti van Aartsen, Gittenberger & Goud, 1998
 Odostomia bruneri A. E. Verrill, 1882
 Odostomia bulbula Hedley, 1907
 Odostomia bulimulus Monterosato, 1874
 Odostomia bullata Nomura, 1937
 Odostomia bullula Gould, 1861
 Odostomia buzzurroi Peñas & Rolán, 1999

C 

 Odostomia calcarella Bartsch, 1912
 Odostomia californica Dall & Bartsch, 1909
 Odostomia callimene Bartsch, 1912
 Odostomia callimorpha Dall & Bartsch, 1909
 Odostomia calliope Bartsch, 1912
 Odostomia callipyrga Dall & Bartsch, 1904
 Odostomia cana A. Adams, 1860
 Odostomia canfieldi Dall, 1908
 Odostomia capa Bartsch, 1926
 Odostomia capensis Thiele, 1925
 Odostomia capitana Dall & Bartsch, 1909
 Odostomia carinata H. Adams, 1873
 Odostomia cassandra Bartsch, 1912
 Odostomia castanea Habe, 1961
 † Odostomia castlecliffensis Laws, 1939
 Odostomia catalinensis Bartsch, 1927
 Odostomia chamorum Saurin, 1958
 Odostomia chariclea Melvill, 1910
 † Odostomia chattonensis Laws, 1939
 Odostomia chinooki Bartsch, 1927
 Odostomia chitonicola E. A. Smith, 1899
 Odostomia chordata Suter, 1908
 Odostomia churchi Smith & Gordon, 1948
 Odostomia ciguatonis Strong, 1949
 Odostomia cincta de Folin, 1879
 Odostomia cionelloides Clessin, 1902
 Odostomia circumcordata Peñas, Rolán & Swinnen, 2014
 Odostomia citrina de Folin, 1869
  † Odostomia civitella T. Oldroyd, 1925
 Odostomia clara Brazier, 1877
 Odostomia clathratula (C.B. Adams, 1852)
 Odostomia clausiliformis Carpenter, 1857
 Odostomia clavulina Fischer P., 1877
 Odostomia clementensis Bartsch, 1927
 Odostomia clementina Dall & Bartsch, 1909
 Odostomia clessini Dall & Bartsch, 1909
 Odostomia collea Bartsch, 1926
 Odostomia columbiana Dall & Bartsch, 1907
 Odostomia communis (C.B. Adams, 1852)
 Odostomia conspicua Alder, 1850
 Odostomia contabulata (Mörch, 1860)
 Odostomia contrerasi Baker, Hanna & Strong, 1928
 Odostomia cookeana Bartsch, 1910
 Odostomia corimbensis Schander, 1994
 Odostomia corintoensis Hertlein & Strong, 1951
 Odostomia corpulentoides Dell, 1956
 Odostomia costaricensis Hertlein & Strong, 1951
 Odostomia crassicollosa Nomura, 1937
 Odostomia crassiplicata Nomura, 1936
 Odostomia crispa (G. B. Sowerby III, 1892)
 Odostomia cryptodon Suter, 1908
 Odostomia crystallina Garrett, 1873
 Odostomia culta Dall & Bartsch, 1906
 Odostomia cumshewaensis Bartsch, 1921
 Odostomia cuspidata Garrett, 1873
 Odostomia cypria Dall & Bartsch, 1912

D-E 

 Odostomia dalsumi van Aartsen, Gittenberger & Goud, 1998
 Odostomia daruma Nomura, 1938
 Odostomia dealbata (Stimpson, 1851)
 Odostomia deceptrix Dall & Bartsch, 1909
 Odostomia decouxi Saurin, 1959
 Odostomia defolinia Dall & Bartsch, 1909
 Odostomia delicatula Carpenter, 1864
 Odostomia deliciosa Dall & Bartsch, 1907
 Odostomia deplexa (Tate & May, 1900)
 Odostomia desimana Dall & Bartsch, 1904
 Odostomia desuefacta Penas & Rolan, 1999
 Odostomia dicella Bartsch, 1912
 Odostomia didyma (Verrill & Bush, 1900)
 Odostomia digitulus Penas & Rolan, 1999
 Odostomia dijkhuizeni van Aartsen, Gittenberger E. & Goud, 1998
 Odostomia dilecta Nomura, 1937
 Odostomia dinella Dall & Bartsch, 1909
 Odostomia disparilis A. E. Verrill, 1884
 Odostomia donilla Dall & Bartsch, 1909
 Odostomia dorica Melvill, 1904
 Odostomia dotella Dall & Bartsch, 1909
 Odostomia dusiensis Nomura, 1937
 Odostomia duureni (van Aartsen, Gittenberger & Goud, 1998)
 Odostomia dyma van Aartsen & Corgan, 1996
 Odostomia eburnea Angas, 1878
 Odostomia edmondi Jordan, 1920
 Odostomia effusa Carpenter, 1857
 Odostomia elata A. Adams, 1860
 Odostomia eldorana Bartsch, 1912
 Odostomia electa Jeffreys, 1883
 Odostomia elsa Dall & Bartsch, 1909
 Odostomia engbergi Bartsch, 1920
 Odostomia enora Dall & Bartsch, 1909
 Odostomia enosimensis Nomura, 1938
 Odostomia era Bartsch, 1927
 Odostomia eremita Peñas & Rolán, 1999
 Odostomia eronea Nomura, 1937
 Odostomia eruca Laseron, 1959
 Odostomia esilda Dall & Bartsch, 1909
 Odostomia eugena Dall & Bartsch, 1909
 Odostomia euglypta Jordan, 1920
 Odostomia exara Dall & Bartsch, 1907
 Odostomia exarata Carpenter, 1857
 Odostomia excelsa Dall & Bartsch, 1909
 Odostomia excisa Bartsch, 1912
 Odostomia exiguita Nomura, 1937
 Odostomia exilis Garrett, 1873
 Odostomia exiliter Peñas, Rolán & Swinnen, 2014
 Odostomia extenuata Penas & Rolan, 1999
 Odostomia eyerdami Bartsch, 1927

F-G 

 Odostomia farallonensis Dall & Bartsch, 1909
 Odostomia farma Dall & Bartsch, 1909
 Odostomia fasciata Carpenter, 1857
 Odostomia fehrae (van Aartsen, Gittenberger & Goud, 1998)
 Odostomia fetella Dall & Bartsch, 1909
 Odostomia fia Bartsch, 1927
 Odostomia franciscana Bartsch, 1917
 Odostomia francoi Penas & Rolan, 1999
 Odostomia franki Peñas & Rolán, 1999
 Odostomia fuijitanii Yokoyama, 1927
 Odostomia funiculustriata Penas & Rolan, 1999
 Odostomia gabrielensis Baker, Hanna & Strong, 1928
 Odostomia galapagensis Dall & Bartsch, 1909
 Odostomia gallegosiana Hertlein & Strong, 1951
 Odostomia garcerii Saurin, 1959
 Odostomia geoffreyi Laws, 1939
 Odostomia gittenbergeri van Aartsen & Corgan, 1996
 Odostomia glabra Clessin, 1902
 Odostomia glaphyra E. A. Smith, 1890
 Odostomia gloriosa Bartsch, 1912
 Odostomia gomezi Peñas, Rolán & Swinnen, 2014
 Odostomia goniostoma A. Adams, 1860
 † Odostomia gorensis Laws, 1939
 Odostomia gouldii Carpenter, 1864
 Odostomia gracilientis (Keep, 1887)
 Odostomia gradusuturae Penas & Rolan, 1999
 Odostomia grammatospira Dall & Bartsch, 1903
 Odostomia granadensis Dall & Bartsch, 1909
 † Odostomia graviapicalis Laws, 1939
 Odostomia gravida Gould, 1853
 Odostomia grijalvae Baker, Hanna & Strong, 1928
 Odostomia grippiana Bartsch, 1912
 Odostomia guatulcoensis Hertlein & Strong, 1951
 Odostomia gulicki Pilsbry, 1918

H-J 

 Odostomia hagemeisteri Dall & Bartsch, 1909
 Odostomia harfordensis Dall & Bartsch, 1907
 Odostomia harukoae Nomura, 1938
 Odostomia harveyi van Aartsen & S.M. Smith, 1996
 Odostomia haurakiensis Laws, 1939
 Odostomia heathi Smith & Gordon, 1948
 Odostomia helena Bartsch, 1912
 Odostomia helga Dall & Bartsch, 1909
 Odostomia hemphilli Dall & Bartsch, 1909
 Odostomia hendersoni Bartsch, 1909
 Odostomia herilda Dall & Bartsch, 1909
 Odostomia herrerae Baker, Hanna & Strong, 1928
 Odostomia hertleini Strong, 1938
 Odostomia heterocincta Bartsch, 1912
 Odostomia hierroensis Peñas & Rolán, 1999
 Odostomia hilgendorfi Clessin, 1900
 Odostomia hipolitensis Dall & Bartsch, 1909
 Odostomia hirotamurana Nomura, 1938
 Odostomia honis Saurin, 1959
 Odostomia hyalina A. Adams, 1860
 Odostomia hyalinella Kuroda & Habe, 1952
 Odostomia hypatia Dall & Bartsch, 1912
 Odostomia hyphala Watson, 1886
 Odostomia icafra Bartch, 1915
 Odostomia ignorata (Monterosato, 1917)
 Odostomia iliuliukensis Dall & Bartsch, 1909
 Odostomia improbabilis Oberling, 1970
 Odostomia incidata Suter, 1908
 Odostomia inconspicua (C.B. Adams, 1852)
 Odostomia inestojeirae Peñas, Rolán & Swinnen, 2019
 Odostomia inflata Carpenter, 1864
 Odostomia infrequens (Nomura, 1937)
 Odostomia inornata Suter, 1908 (nomen dubium)
 Odostomia intermedia (Carpenter, 1857)
 † Odostomia iota Maxwell, 1992
 Odostomia irafca Bartsch, 1915
 Odostomia isthmiea Strong & Hertlein, 1939
 Odostomia italoi Penas & Rolan, 1999
 Odostomia jacquesi Penas & Rolan, 1999
 Odostomia jesusabadi Peñas, Rolán & Swinnen, 2019
 Odostomia jonesii Verrill & Bush, 1900

K-L 

 Odostomia kadiakensis Dall & Bartsch, 1909
 Odostomia kelseyi Bartsch, 1912
 Odostomia kennerleyi Dall & Bartsch, 1907
 Odostomia kergueleae van Aartsen & Corgan, 1996
 Odostomia khanhoana Saurin, 1959
 Odostomia killisnooensis Dall & Bartsch, 1909
 Odostomia kotorana Nomura, 1937
 Odostomia krausei Clessin, 1900
 Odostomia kreffti Angas, 1867
 Odostomia kromi van Aartsen, Menkhorst & Gittenberger, 1984
 Odostomia kuiperi (van Aartsen, Gittenberger & Goud, 1998)
 Odostomia laevigata (d’Orbigny, 1841)
 Odostomia laicismorum Peñas, Rolán & Swinnen, 2014
 Odostomia lapazana Dall & Bartsch, 1909
 Odostomia lastra Dall & Bartsch, 1909
 Odostomia lavertinae E. A. Smith, 1901
 Odostomia leopardis Laseron, 1951
 Odostomia lesuroiti Peñas & Rolán, 1999
 Odostomia licina Dall & Bartsch, 1909
 Odostomia limhaughi Hertlein & Allison, 1968
 Odostomia limpida Dall & Bartsch, 1906
 Odostomia litiopina Melvill & Standen, 1901
 Odostomia loomisi Dall & Bartsch, 1909
 Odostomia lorellae Micali, 1987
 Odostomia lorioli (Hornung & Mermod, 1924)
 Odostomia lubrica Verrill & Bush, 1900
 Odostomia lucasana Dall & Bartsch, 1909
 Odostomia lucca Dall & Bartsch, 1909 
 Odostomia lukisii Jeffreys, 1859

M-N 

 Odostomia mabutii Nomura, 1938
 Odostomia maccullochi Hedley, 1909
 Odostomia madeirensis Peñas, Rolán & Swinnen, 2014
 Odostomia magnumos Saurin, 1962
 † Odostomia mahoenuica Laws, 1939
 Odostomia major Melvill & Standen, 1901
 Odostomia mammillata Carpenter, 1857
 Odostomia manukauensis Laws, 1939
 Odostomia mara Bartsch, 1926
 Odostomia margarita Pilsbry, 1918
 Odostomia marginata (C.B. Adams, 1852)
 Odostomia mariae Bartsch, 1928
 Odostomia martinensis Strong, 1938
 Odostomia matsusimana Nomura, 1936
 Odostomia mauritiana Dall & Bartsch, 1906 
 Odostomia megerlei (Locard, 1886)
 Odostomia meijeri van Aartsen, Gittenberger E. & Goud, 1998
 Odostomia melitta Bartsch, 1924
 Odostomia mendozae Baker, Hanna & Strong, 1928
 Odostomia mera Laseron, 1959
 Odostomia mesomorpha Schander, 1994
 Odostomia metcalfei Pritchard & Gatliff, 1900
 Odostomia microeques Rolán & Templado in Peñas & Rolán, 1999
 Odostomia microlinea Laseron, 1951
 Odostomia micrometrica Penas & Rolan, 1999
 Odostomia minormirabilis Peñas, Rolán & Swinnen, 2014
 Odostomia minutissima Dall & Bartsch, 1909
 Odostomia monodon (Requien, 1848)
 Odostomia moratora Dall & Bartsch, 1909
 Odostomia movilla Dall & Bartsch, 1909
 Odostomia muelleri Clessin, 1900
 Odostomia murdochi Suter, 1913
 Odostomia nana A. Adams, 1860
 Odostomia nardoi Brusina, 1869
 Odostomia natata Penas & Rolan, 1999
 Odostomia natukoae Nomura, 1938
 Odostomia navarettei Baker, Hanna & Strong, 1928
 Odostomia neglecta A. Adams, 1860
 Odostomia nemo Dall & Bartsch, 1909
 Odostomia nicoyana Hertlein & Strong, 1951
 Odostomia nivea A. Adams, 1860
 Odostomia nodosa Carpenter, 1857
 Odostomia nofronii Buzzurro, 2002
 Odostomia nota Dall & Bartsch, 1909
 Odostomia notabilis (C.B. Adams, 1852)
 Odostomia notilla Dall & Bartsch, 1909 
 Odostomia nova Castellanos, 1982
 Odostomia nuciformis Carpenter, 1864
 Odostomia nunivakensis Dall & Bartsch, 1909

O-P 

 Odostomia obesula A. Adams, 1860
 Odostomia oblongella Corgan, 1970
 Odostomia oblongula Marshall, 1895
 † Odostomia obstinata Laws, 1939
 Odostomia occultidens May W.L., 1915 
 Odostomia odostomella Peñas & Rolán, 1999
 Odostomia oldroydi Dall & Bartsch, 1909 
 Odostomia olssoni Bartsch, 1924
 Odostomia omphaloessa Watson, 1897
 Odostomia oonisca Dall & Bartsch, 1909
 Odostomia optata Yokoyama, 1920
 Odostomia orariana Dall & Bartsch, 1909 
 Odostomia oregonensis Dall & Bartsch, 1907
 Odostomia ornatissima (Haas, 1943)
 Odostomia oryza Garrett, 1873
 † Odostomia ototarana Laws, 1939
 Odostomia ovata Carpenter, 1857
 Odostomia ovoidea A. Adams, 1860
 Odostomia oxia Watson, 1886
 Odostomia oyasiwo Nomura, 1939
 Odostomia paardekooperi van Aartsen, Gittenberger & Goud, 1998
 Odostomia pacha Bartsch, 1926
 Odostomia pallidior Nomura, 1937
 Odostomia palmeri Bartsch, 1912
 Odostomia palmaensis (Peñas & Rolán, 1999)
 Odostomia palmeri Bartsch, 1912
 Odostomia panamensis Clessin, 1900
 Odostomia parella Dall & Bartsch, 1909
 Odostomia parodontosis Schander, 1994
 Odostomia parvacutangula Laws, 1939
 Odostomia paulhenrii Penas & Rolan, 1999
 Odostomia paupercula (C.B. Adams, 1852)
 Odostomia pedica Laws, 1939
 Odostomia pedroana Dall & Bartsch, 1909
 Odostomia perspicua Thiele, 1930
 Odostomia pervaga Laws, 1939
 Odostomia pesa Dall & Bartsch, 1909
 Odostomia petterdi (Gatliff, 1900)
 Odostomia pfeifferi Preston, 1908
 Odostomia phanella Dall & Bartsch, 1909
 Odostomia pharcida Dall & Bartsch, 1907
 Odostomia photis Carpenter, 1857
 Odostomia pilsbryi Dall & Bartsch, 1904
 † Odostomia pleioregona Bartsch, 1917
 Odostomia plicata (Montagu, 1803)
 Odostomia pocahontasae Henderson & Bartsch, 1914
 Odostomia polita Pease, 1867
 Odostomia poppei Dall & Bartsch, 1909
 Odostomia porteri Baker, Hanna & Strong, 1928
 Odostomia pratoma Dall & Bartsch, 1909
 Odostomia principalis Peñas, Rolán & Swinnen, 2014
 Odostomia prinsi van Aartsen, Gittenberger & Goud, 1998
 Odostomia producta A. Adams, 1860
 Odostomia profundicola Dall & Bartsch, 1909
 Odostomia profundiperforata Nomura, 1937
 Odostomia promeces Dall & Bartsch, 1909
 Odostomia prona (Peñas & Rolán, 1999)
 Odostomia proxima (de Folin, 1872)
 Odostomia pruinosa A. Adams, 1860
 Odostomia pseudoprona Peñas, Rolán & Swinnen, 2019
 Odostomia pudica Suter, 1908
 Odostomia puelchana Castellanos, 1982
 Odostomia pulchra (de Folin, 1872)
 Odostomia pulcia Dall & Bartsch, 1909 
 Odostomia pupa A. Adams, 1860
 Odostomia pygmaea A. Adams, 1860
 Odostomia pyxidata Schander, 1994

Q-R 

 Odostomia quadrae Dall & Bartsch, 1910
 Odostomia quilla Bartsch, 1926
 Odostomia raymondi  Dall & Bartsch, 1909 
 Odostomia recta (de Folin, 1872)
 Odostomia reedi Bartsch, 1928
 Odostomia reigeni Carpenter, 1857
 Odostomia resina Dall & Bartsch, 1909
 Odostomia restii (Peñas & Rolán, 1999)
 Odostomia rhizophorae Hertlein & Strong, 1951
 Odostomia richi Dall & Bartsch, 1909
 Odostomia rinella Dall & Bartsch, 1909
 Odostomia rissoiformis Milaschewitsch, 1909
 Odostomia ritteri Dall & Bartsch, 1909
 Odostomia romburghi van Aartsen, Gittenberger & Goud, 1998
 Odostomia rosacea Pease, 1867
 Odostomia rotundata Carpenter, 1857
 Odostomia rubra Pease, 1867
 Odostomia ryalea Bartsch, 1927

S 

 Odostomia salinasensis Bartsch, 1928
 Odostomia sanctorum Dall & Bartsch, 1909
 Odostomia sanetomoi Nomura, 1938
 Odostomia sanjuanensis Bartsch, 1920
 Odostomia santamariensis Bartsch, 1917
 Odostomia satura Carpenter, 1864
 Odostomia scalariformis Carpenter, 1857
 Odostomia scalarina Gould, 1861
 Odostomia scalina A. Adams, 1860
 Odostomia scammonensis Dall & Bartsch, 1909 
 Odostomia schrami van Aartsen, Gittenberger E. & Goud, 1998
 Odostomia septentrionalis Dall & Bartsch, 1909
 Odostomia serilla Dall & Bartsch, 1909 
 Odostomia setoutiensis Nomura, 1939
 † Odostomia sherriffi Hutton, 1883
 Odostomia shimosensis Yokoyama, 1922
 Odostomia silesui Nofroni, 1988
 Odostomia sillana Dall & Bartsch, 1909
 Odostomia siogamensis Nomura, 1936
 Odostomia sitiroi Nomura, 1937
 Odostomia sitkaensis Clessin, 1900
 Odostomia skidegatensis Bartsch, 1912
 Odostomia solidula C. B. Adams, 1850
 Odostomia soluta Gould, 1861
 Odostomia sordida (Lea, 1842)
 Odostomia sorenseni Strong, 1949
 Odostomia sorianoi Peñas & Rolán, 2006
 Odostomia sperabilis Hedley, 1909
 Odostomia spreadboroughi Dall & Bartsch, 1910
 Odostomia stearnsiella Pilsbry, 1918
 Odostomia stephensae Dall & Bartsch, 1909
 Odostomia striata (A. E. Verrill, 1880)
 Odostomia stricta Laseron, 1951
 Odostomia striolata Forbes & Hanley, 1850
 Odostomia strongi Bartsch, 1927
 Odostomia subdiaphana A. Adams, 1860
 Odostomia subdotella Hertlein & Strong, 1951
 Odostomia subglobosa Bartsch, 1912
 Odostomia sublimpida Yokoyama, 1920
 Odostomia sublirulata Carpenter, 1857
 Odostomia suboblonga Jeffreys, 1884
 Odostomia suboxia Yokoyama, 1920
 Odostomia suboxioides Nomura, 1936
 Odostomia subscripta Schander, 1994
 Odostomia subturrita Dall & Bartsch, 1909
 Odostomia suezakiensis Nomura, 1936
 Odostomia sulcosa (Mighels, 1843)
 Odostomia suprasulcata Penas & Rolan, 1999
 Odostomia swetti Strong & Hertlein, 1939
 Odostomia syrnoloides Melvill, 1896

T 

 Odostomia tacomaensis Dall & Bartsch, 1907
 Odostomia takapunaensis Suter, 1908
 Odostomia talama Dall & Bartsch, 1909
 Odostomia talpa Dall & Bartsch, 1909
 Odostomia tanegasimana Nomura, 1939
 Odostomia taravali Bartsch, 1917
 Odostomia tasmanica (Tenison Woods, 1877) 
 Odostomia taumakiensis Suter, 1908
 Odostomia tehuantepeeana Hertlein & Strong, 1951
 Odostomia telescopium Carpenter, 1857
 Odostomia tenera A. Adams, 1860
 Odostomia tenuis Carpenter, 1857
 Odostomia tenuisculpta Carpenter, 1864
 Odostomia terebellum (C.B. Adams, 1852)
 Odostomia terissa Pilsbry & Lowe, 1932
 Odostomia terrieula Dall & Bartsch in Arnold, 1903
 Odostomia testiculus Peñas & Rolán, 1999
 Odostomia thalia Bartsch, 1912
 Odostomia thea Bartsch, 1912
 Odostomia tomacula (Laseron, 1951)
 Odostomia tomlini W.H. Turton, 1933
 Odostomia torrita Dall & Bartsch, 1909
 Odostomia trachis Dall & Bartsch, 1909
 Odostomia translucens (Strebel, 1908)
 Odostomia tremperi Bartsch, 1927
 Odostomia trimariana Pilsbry & Lowe, 1932
 Odostomia tritestata Nomura, 1937
 Odostomia tropidita Dall & Bartsch, 1909
 Odostomia turgida (G. O. Sars, 1878)
 Odostomia turneri Laws, 1939
 Odostomia turricula Dall & Bartsch, 1903
 Odostomia turriculata Monterosato, 1869
 Odostomia turrita Hanley, 1844
 Odostomia tyleri Dall & Bartsch, 1909

U-V 

 Odostomia ulloana Strong, 1949
 Odostomia umbilicaris (Malm, 1863)
 Odostomia umbilicatissima (Peñas & Rolán, 1999)
 Odostomia unalaskensis Dall & Bartsch, 1909
 Odostomia unidens (Requien, 1848)
 Odostomia unidentata (Montagu, 1803)
 Odostomia unilineata Garrett, 1873
 Odostomia vaga Laws, 1939
 Odostomia valdezi Dall & Bartsch, 1907
 Odostomia valeroi Bartsch, 1917
 Odostomia vancouverensis Dall & Bartsch, 1910
 Odostomia ventricosa A. Adams, 1860
 Odostomia vera Moreno, Peñas & Rolán, 2003
 Odostomia verhoeveni van Aartsen, Gittenberger E. & Goud, 1998
 Odostomia vestalis Murdoch, 1905
 Odostomia victoriae Gatliff & Gabriel, 1911
 Odostomia vira Bartsch, 1926
 Odostomia virginalis Dall & Bartsch, 1909
 Odostomia virginica Henderson & Bartsch, 1914
 Odostomia vitrea A. Adams, 1860
  † Odostomia vixornata (Marwick, 1931)
 Odostomia vizcainoana Baker, Hanna & Strong, 1928

W-Z 

 † Odostomia waihaoensis Maxwell, 1992
 † Odostomia waipaoa Marwick, 1931
 † Odostomia waitakiensis Laws, 1939
 Odostomia wareni (Schander, 1994)
 Odostomia washingtonia Bartsch, 1920
 † Odostomia whangaparaoa Grant-Mackie & Chapman-Smith, 1971
 Odostomia whitei Bartsch, 1927
 Odostomia willetti Bartsch, 1917
 Odostomia winfriedi (Peñas & Rolán, 1999)
 Odostomia winkleyi Bartsch, 1909
 Odostomia woodhridgei Hertlein & Strong, 1951
 Odostomia yokoyamai Nomura, 1936
 Odostomia youngi Dall & Bartsch, 1910
 Odostomia yuigahamana Nomura, 1938
 Odostomia zamia Nomura, 1937
 Odostomia zannii Penas & Rolan, 1999
 † Odostomia zecorpulenta Laws, 1939
 Odostomia zeteki Bartsch, 1918
 Odostomia ziziphina Carpenter, 1857

Synonyms
The following species were brought into synonymy:

 Odostomia aciculina Souverbie, 1865: synonym of Styloptygma aciculina (Souverbie, 1865) (original combination)
 Odostomia acuticostata Jeffreys, 1884: synonym of Turbonilla postacuticostata Sacco, 1892
 Odostomia alba Calkins, 1878: synonym of Melanella conoidea (Kurtz & Stimpson, 1851)
 Odostomia albella (Loven): synonym of Odostomia unidentata (Montagu, 1803)
 Odostomia amiantus Dall & Bartsch, 1907: synonym of Odostomia amianta Dall & Bartsch, 1907
 Odostomia amoena Monterosato, 1878: synonym of Turbonilla amoena (Monterosato, 1878)
 Odostomia angasi Tryon, 1886: synonym of Syrnola angasi (Tryon, 1886)
 Odostomia arctica Dall & Bartsch, 1909: synonym of Aartsenia arctica (Dall & Bartsch, 1909)
 Odostomia attenuata Jeffreys, 1884: synonym of Turbonilla micans (Monterosato, 1875)
 Odostomia audoax [sic]: synonym of Odostomia audax Baker, Hanna & Strong, 1928
 Odostomia babylonia (C. B. Adams, 1845): synonym of Pseudoscilla babylonia (C. B. Adams, 1845)
 Odostomia barashi Bogi & Galil, 2000: synonym of Auristomia barashi (Bogi & Galil, 2000)
 Odostomia boteroi Schander, 1994: synonym of Megastomia boteroi (Schander, 1994)
 Odostomia carrozzai van Aartsen, 1987: synonym of Brachystomia carrozzai (van Aartsen, 1987)
 Odostomia brevicula Jeffreys, 1883: synonym of Turbonilla amoena (Monterosato, 1878)
 Odostomia canaliculata C. B. Adams, 1850: synonym of Eulimastoma canaliculatum (C. B. Adams, 1850)
 Odostomia canaria Hedley, 1907: synonym of Syrnola canaria (Hedley, 1907)
 Odostomia clathrata Jeffreys, 1848: synonym of Chrysallida clathrata (Jeffreys, 1848)
 Odostomia compressa Jeffreys, 1884: synonym of Turbonilla amoena (Monterosato, 1878)
 Odostomia conoidea (Brocchi, 1814): synonym of Megastomia conoidea (Brocchi, 1814)
 Odostomia convexa Carpenter, 1857: synonym of Chrysallida convexa (Carpenter, 1857)
 Odostomia crassicostata W.H. Turton, 1932: synonym of Hinemoa crassella van Aartsen & Corgan, 1996
 Odostomia dekleini (Aartsen, Gittenberger & Goud, 1998): synonym of Odetta dekleini van Aartsen, Gittenberger E. & Goud, 1998
 Odostomia delicata Monterosato, 1874: synonym of Turbonilla acuta (Donovan, 1804)
 Odostomia densestriata Garrett, 1873: synonym of Syrnola densestriata (Garrett, 1873)
 Odostomia desmiti van Aartsen, Gittenberger E. & Goud, 1998: synonym of Megastomia desmiti (van Aartsen, Gittenberger & Goud, 1998)
 Odostomia didyma W.H. Turton, 1932: synonym of Odostomia dyma van Aartsen & Corgan, 1996
 Odostomia dilucida (Monterosato, 1884): synonym of Ondina dilucida (Monterosato, 1884)
 Odostomia dulcis W.H. Turton, 1932: synonym of Odostomia gittenbergeri van Aartsen & Corgan, 1996
 Odostomia dux Dall & Bartsch, 1906: synonym of Chrysallida dux (Dall & Bartsch, 1906)
 Odostomia eclecta Pilsbry, 1918: synonym of Evalea eclecta (Pilsbry, 1918)
 Odostomia elegans A. Adams, 1860: synonym of Evalea elegans (A. Adams, 1860)
 Odostomia elegantissima (Montagu, 1803): synonym of Turbonilla lactea (Linnaeus, 1758)
 Odostomia engonia Bush, 1885: synonym of Eulimastoma engonium (Bush, 1885)
 Odostomia erecta W.H. Turton, 1932: synonym of Odostomia barnardi van Aartsen & Corgan, 1996
 Odostomia erjaveciana Brusina, 1869: synonym of Auristomia erjaveciana (Brusina, 1869)
 Odostomia eucosmia Dall & Bartsch, 1909: synonym of Iolaea eucosmia Dall & Bartsch, 1909
 Odostomia eulimoides Hanley, 1844: synonym of Brachystomia eulimoides (Hanley, 1844)
 Odostomia eutropia Melvill, 1899: synonym of Eulimastoma eutropia (Melvill, 1899)
 Odostomia excolpa Bartsch, 1912: synonym of Besla excolpa (Bartsch, 1912)
 Odostomia formosa Jeffreys, 1848: synonym of Turbonilla rufa (Philippi, 1836)
 Odostomia formosa W.H. Turton, 1932: synonym of Chrysallida africana van Aartsen & Corgan, 1996
 Odostomia fulgidula Jeffreys, 1884: synonym of Turbonilla fulgidula (Jeffreys, 1884)
 Odostomia fusulus Monterosato, 1878: synonym of Auristomia fusulus (Monterosato, 1878)
 Odostomia gemma (A. Adams, 1861): synonym of Miralda gemma (A. Adams, 1861)
 Odostomia gigantea Dunker, 1877: synonym of Leucotina casta (A. Adams, 1853)
 Odostomia gisna Dall & Bartsch, 1904: synonym of Helodiamea gisna (Dall & Bartsch, 1904) 
 Odostomia glabrata sensu Forbes & Hanley, 1850: synonym of Odostomia megerlei (Locard, 1886)
 Odostomia gracilis Pease, 1868: synonym of Evalea waikikiensis (Pilsbry, 1918)
 Odostomia haleiwensis Pilsbry, 1918: synonym of Evalea waikikiensis (Pilsbry, 1918)
 Odostomia hiloensis Pilsbry, 1944: synonym of Evalea waikikiensis (Pilsbry, 1918)
 Odostomia hiloensis Pilsbry, 1918: synonym of Odostomia stearnsiella Pilsbry, 1918
 Odostomia hypocurta Dall & Bartsch, 1909: synonym of Menestho hypocurta (Dall & Bartsch, 1909)
 Odostomia insculpta (Montagu, 1808): synonym of Ondina divisa (J. Adams, 1797)
 Odostomia intermedia Brusina, 1869: synonym of Chrysallida ghisottii (van Aartsen, 1984)
 Odostomia io W.H. Turton, 1932: synonym of Evalea carinae van Aartsen & Corgan, 1996
 Odostomia jadisi Olsson & McGinty, 1958: synonym of Boonea jadisi (Olsson & McGinty, 1958)
 Odostomia kahoolawensis Pilsbry, 1918: synonym of Odostomia stearnsiella Pilsbry, 1918
 Odostomia lactea Angas, 1867: synonym of Syrnola angasi (Tryon, 1886)
 Odostomia lacunata Carpenter, 1857: synonym of Egila lacunata (Carpenter, 1857)
 Odostomia letsonae Pilsbry, 1918: synonym of Chrystella letsonae (Pilsbry, 1918)
 Odostomia lutea Garrett, 1873: synonym of Styloptygma luteum (Garrett, 1873)
 Odostomia magnifica Seguenza G., 1879: synonym of Turbonilla magnifica (Seguenza G., 1879)
 Odostomia marci (van Aartsen, Gittenberger & Goud, 1998): synonym of Odetta marci van Aartsen, Gittenberger & Goud, 1998
 Odostomia martensi Dall & Bartsch, 1906: synonym of Aartsenia martensi (Dall & Bartsch, 1906)
 Odostomia metata Hedley, 1907: synonym of Odostomella metata (Hedley, 1907)
 Odostomia micans Monterosato, 1875: synonym of Turbonilla micans (Monterosato, 1875)
 Odostomia minima Jeffreys, 1858: synonym of Cima minima (Jeffreys, 1858)
 Odostomia modesta (Stimpson, 1851): synonym of Fargoa bartschi (Winkley, 1909)
 Odostomia monaulax Pilsbry, 1918: synonym of Odostomia stearnsiella Pilsbry, 1918
 Odostomia moulinsiana P. Fischer, 1864: synonym of Chrysallida terebellum (Philippi, 1844)
 Odostomia nanodea Monterosato, 1878: synonym of Chrysallida juliae (de Folin, 1872)
 Odostomia navisa Dall & Bartsch, 1907: synonym of Folinella navisa (Dall & Bartsch, 1907)
 Odostomia nisoides Brugnone, 1873: synonym of Eulimella scillae (Scacchi, 1835)
 Odostomia nitens Jeffreys, 1870: synonym of Doliella nitens (Jeffreys, 1870)
 Odostomia nitida Alder, 1844: synonym of Odostomia scalaris MacGillivray, 1843
 Odostomia nivosa (Montagu, 1803): synonym of Chrysallida nivosa (Montagu, 1803)
 Odostomia normani Friele, 1886: synonym of Ondina normani (Friele, 1886)
 Odostomia obeliscus W.H. Turton, 1932: synonym of Odostomia becki W.H. Turton, 1933
 Odostomia obeliscus Garrett, 1873: synonym of Syrnola obeliscus (Garrett, 1873)
 Odostomia obliqua Alder, 1844: synonym of Ondina obliqua (Alder, 1844)
 Odostomia obtusa W.H. Turton, 1932: synonym of Odostomia tomlini W.H. Turton, 1933
 Odostomia omaensis Nomura, 1938: synonym of Brachystomia omaensis (Nomura, 1938)
 Odostomia ooniscia Dall & Bartsch, 1909: synonym of Odostomia oonisca Dall & Bartsch, 1909
 Odostomia ornata W.H. Turton, 1932: synonym of Chrysallida vanbruggeni van Aartsen & Corgan, 1996
 Odostomia pagodiformis Schander, 1994: synonym of Megastomia pagodiformis (Schander, 1994)
 Odostomia pallida (Montagu, 1803): synonym of Brachystomia eulimoides (Hanley, 1844)
 Odostomia patricia Pilsbry, 1918: synonym of Herviera patricia (Pilsbry, 1918)
 Odostomia paucistriata Jeffreys, 1884: synonym of Turbonilla paucistriata (Jeffreys, 1884)
 Odostomia peregrina Thiele, 1912: synonym of Odostomia kergueleae van Aartsen & Corgan, 1996
 Odostomia praelonga Jeffreys, 1884: synonym of Eulimella cerullii (Cossmann, 1916)
 Odostomia pretiosa W.H. Turton, 1932: synonym of Pyrgulina sowerbyi van Aartsen & Corgan, 1996
 Odostomia prima Pilsbry, 1918: synonym of Nesiodostomia tertia (Pilsbry, 1918)
 Odostomia producta (C. B. Adams, 1840): synonym of Syrnola producta (C. B. Adams, 1840)
 Odostomia pulcherrima Dall & Bartsch, 1909: synonym of Boonea cincta (Carpenter, 1864)
 Odostomia pulchra Garrett, 1873: synonym of Linopyrga pulchra (Garrett, 1873)
 Odostomia pulcia Dall & Bartsch, 1909: synonym of Boonea cincta (Carpenter, 1864)
 Odostomia pupaeformis Souverbie, 1865: synonym of Pyrgulina pupaeformis (Souverbie, 1865)
 Odostomia pupu Pilsbry, 1918: synonym of Hinemoa indica (Melvill, 1896)
 Odostomia quarta Pilsbry, 1918: synonym of Nesiodostomia quarta (Pilsbry, 1918)
 Odostomia quinquecincta (Carpenter, 1856): synonym of Folinella quinquecincta (Carpenter, 1856)
 Odostomia quinta Pilsbry, 1918: synonym of Nesiodostomia tertia (Pilsbry, 1918)
 Odostomia rissoides Hanley, 1844: synonym of Odostomia scalaris MacGillivray, 1843
 Odostomia rissoiformis Milachevitch, 1912: synonym of Odostomia albella (Loven)
 Odostomia robusta G.B. Sowerby III, 1901: synonym of Pyrgulina durabilis van Aartsen & Corgan, 1996
 Odostomia rosea Monterosato, 1877: synonym of Turbonilla internodula (S.V. Wood, 1848)
 Odostomia rufula Souverbie, 1875: synonym of Odostomia lutea Garrett, 1873
 Odostomia rugata Hutton, 1886: synonym of Linopyrga rugata (Hutton, 1886)
 Odostomia rutor Nofroni & Schander, 1994: synonym of Auristomia rutor (Nofroni & Schander, 1994)
 Odostomia sapia Dall & Bartsch, 1909: synonym of Boonea cincta (Carpenter, 1864)
 Odostomia scalaris (Philippi, 1836): synonym of Pyrgiscus jeffreysii (Jeffreys, 1848)
 Odostomia scillae (Scacchi, 1835): synonym of Eulimella scillae (Scacchi, 1835)
 Odostomia scopulorum Watson, 1886: synonym of Miralda scopulorum (Watson, 1886)
 Odostomia secunda Pilsbry, 1918: synonym of Nesiodostomia montforti Corgan, 1972
 Odostomia sicula Philippi, 1851: synonym of Megastomia conoidea (Brocchi, 1814)
 Odostomia sigmoidea Monterosato, 1880: synonym of Chrysallida sigmoidea (Monterosato, 1880)
 Odostomia sinuosa Jeffreys, 1884: synonym of Turbonilla sinuosa (Jeffreys, 1884)
 Odostomia sinuosa Nomura, 1937: synonym of Sinuatodostomia nomurai van Aartsen & Corgan, 1996
 Odostomia socorroensis Dall & Bartsch, 1909: synonym of Odostomia tenuisculpta Carpenter, 1864
 Odostomia somersi Verrill & Bush, 1900: synonym of Boonea somersi (Verrill & Bush, 1900)
 Odostomia sulcata Hutton, 1885: synonym of Leucotina casta (A. Adams, 1853)
 Odostomia sulcata Garrett, 1873: synonym of Turbonilla garrettiana Dall & Bartsch, 1906
 Odostomia sulcifera E.A. Smith, 1871: synonym of Megastomia sulcifera (E.A. Smith, 1871)
 Odostomia suta Pilsbry, 1918: synonym of Teretianax suta (Pilsbry, 1918)
 Odostomia teres Bush, 1885: synonym of Eulimastoma engonium (Bush, 1885)
 Odostomia terryi Olsson & McGinty, 1958: synonym of Ivara terryi (Olsson & McGinty, 1958)
 Odostomia testicula (Peñas & Rolán, 1999): synonym of Odostomia testiculus Peñas & Rolán, 1999
 Odostomia tornata A. E. Verrill, 1884: synonym of Oscilla tornata (A. E. Verrill, 1884)
 Odostomia toroensis (Olsson & McGinty, 1958): synonym of Mumiola gradatula (Mörch, 1876)
 Odostomia trifida (Totten, 1834): synonym of Boonea bisuturalis (Say, 1822)
 Odostomia truncatula Jeffreys, 1850: synonym of Jordaniella truncatula (Jeffreys, 1850)
 Odostomia turbonilloides Brusina, 1869: synonym of Chrysallida incerta (Milaschewitsch, 1916)
 Odostomia unifasciata (Forbes, 1844): synonym of Eulimella unifasciata (Forbes, 1844)
 Odostomia vanurki van Aartsen, Gittenberger E. & Goud, 1998: synonym of Odostomia wareni (Schander, 1994)
 Odostomia venusta Monterosato, 1875: synonym of Turbonilla amoena (Monterosato, 1878)
 Odostomia verduini van Aartsen, 1987: synonym of Odostomia improbabilis Oberling, 1970
 Odostomia vicola Dall & Bartsch, 1909: synonym of Boonea cincta (Carpenter, 1864)
 Odostomia vincta Dall & Bartsch, 1909: synonym of Boonea cincta (Carpenter, 1864)
 Odostomia weberi Morrison, 1965: synonym of Eulimastoma weberi (Morrison, 1965)
 Odostomia zijpi van Aartsen, Gittenberger E. & Goud, 1998: synonym of Megastomia zijpi (van Aartsen, Gittenberger & Goud, 1998)

References 

Odostomia
Odostomia